Shinkiari (Hindko/Urdu: شنکیاری) is a Union Council of Mansehra District in the Khyber Pakhtunkhwa province of Pakistan. It is a major tea city with many tea gardens. The police station was established before the Partition of India. At that time, Baffa was a police chowki of Shinkiari Police Station and the second police chowki was in Battal. Both chowkies have now become police stations while historically with poor political background Shinkiari is still a police station instead of a tehsil of Mansehra District. Most of the people are from the Swati Pashtun and Gujjar tribes, speaking Pashto and Hindko.

Etymology
Shinkiari is a combination of two Pashto words, shīn meaning "green" and kyārəi meaning "flowerbed".

Geography
The specialty here is drinking water that is very sweet and tasty with many digestive minerals such as Nara and Pishora. This is the main reason for the increasing population of the city. It is a very important city from its political and geographical points of view. Its topography is very level towards Lower Pakhal. It is the very first city of Pakhal. It is a junction point for Siran Valley, Konsh Valley and Baffa.

Shinkiari is located 18 km north of Mansehra city on the Karakoram Highway, it is located at 34°28'0N, 73°16'60E at an altitude of 1019 metres (3346 feet). Due to its strategic location Shinkiari is also a base for the Pakistan Army. Pakistan Junior Leaders Academy (JLA) is the army training centre for juniors. The city is a major stop for people travelling north. It is a historical city. There is very flat cultivated land for vegetables, grains, sugar cane, tobacco leaves, rice and uses for many other agricultural purposes.

Pakistan Forest Institution college was reconstructed after the earthquake of 2005 and is located just 3 km away from the city toward the Great Forest (jungle) and the same way proceeds just towards Kund Bangla.

Terrain
Shinkiari is known for cultivating the first tea garden in Pakistan because of its natural environment and terrain. One can access Kund Rest house 24 km away in the Jabori forest range over the top of the hill. This rest house was built during English empire in 1919. It was also damaged in the earthquake of 2005 and could not be rebuilt by The Government of Pakistan.

It should be administered as a tehsil due to its covered area of 14 joint union councils.

References

Mansehra District